Bilel Ben Messaoud (born 8 August 1989) is a retired Tunisian football midfielder.

References

1989 births
Living people
Tunisian footballers
Tunisia international footballers
AS Marsa players
Étoile Sportive du Sahel players
US Ben Guerdane players
Association football midfielders
Tunisian Ligue Professionnelle 1 players